The 2008-09 Professional Arena Soccer League (PASL-Pro) is the inaugural season for the league. The PASL-Pro is the largest indoor soccer league, hosting 21 teams spreading from Canada, the United States of America, and the Mexico. All US soccer clubs were invited to play in the United States Open Cup for Arena Soccer which 25 PASL-Pro and PASL-Premier teams, respectively, played in, as well as future PASL-Pro team, the San Diego Sockers.

The league kicked off at the Stockton Arena with the Stockton Cougars defeating the Colorado Lightning 10-5. The regular season concluded March 8, 2009 with three separate matches.

On March 15, 2009 the Stockton Cougars won the inaugural championship 13-5 over 1790 Cincinnati. Stockton's goalkeeper, Jesus Molina, was named the playoffs MVP

Standings
As of March 15, 2009

(Bold indicates Division Winner)

2009 PASL-Pro North American Finals (at Stockton, CA)

Awards

All-League First Team

All-League Second Team

External links
PASL-Pro official website

 
Professional Arena Soccer League
Professional Arena Soccer League
Professional Arena Soccer League seasons